Angeliki Papoulia (born 1975) is a Greek actress and theatre director. In film, she is most notable for her roles in Dogtooth, Alps and The Lobster by Yorgos Lanthimos, and A Blast and The Miracle of the Sargasso Sea by Syllas Tzoumerkas. For her part in Dogtooth she was awarded with a Heart of Sarajevo for Best Actress (together with Mary Tsoni).

Life and career
Papoulia was born in 1975 in Athens, Greece. She graduated from the Embros drama school. Right after her graduation she collaborated with Greek theatre directors Michail Marmarinos, Lefteris Voyatzis and Yannis Houvardas in various performances, most notably National Anthem'', School of Women, and Romeo and Juliet.

In 2004, Papoulia founded with fellow actors Christos Passalis and Yorgos Valais the blitz theatre group. Since then, she co-directed, co-written and acted in all of the group's performances in Athens and across Europe: Motherland (Bios theatre, Athens), Joy Division (Bios theatre, Athens), New Order (Bios theatre, Athens), Faust (National Theatre of Greece), Katerini (Athens and Epidaurus Festival), Guns! Guns! Guns! (National Theatre of Greece),  Cinemascope (Athens and Epidaurus Festival and Bios theatre, Athens), Galaxy (Michalis Cacoyannis Institute, Athens & Schaubuhne, Berlin), Don Quixote (Athens & Epidaurus Festival), Late Night (Onassis Cultural Center and La Filature), Vanya - Ten years After (Technis theatre in co-production with La Comédie de Reims and Théâtre Dijon-Bourgogne), 6am How To Disappear Completely (Onassis Cultural Center in co-production with Sao Luiz Teatro Municipal, Lisbon, La Filature, La Comédie De Reims, Théâtre De La Ville - Paris, Nouveau Théâtre De Montreuil, Ligne Directe - Paris  and Festival d' Avignon). One of the most celebrated Greek theatre ensembles, the blitz theatre group define their basic principles as following: "theatre is a field where people meet each other and exchange ideas in the most essential way, not a field for virtuosity and ready made truths. There is a need for answers to what society asks from art today and what theatrical structures stand for in the dawn of the 21st century. All members are equal throughout conception, writing, direction and dramaturgy process, everything is under doubt, there is nothing to be taken for granted, neither in theatre nor in life."

Parallel to her theater work, Papoulia started her film acting career with short films and a minor part in feature film Alexandreia by Maria Iliiou. In 2002, she appeared in Yannis Economidis' debut film "Matchbox" in the part of Kiki.

In 2008, Papoulia had the leading part of 'Older Daughter' in Yorgos Lanthimos' Oscar nominated and Cannes film festival awarded Dogtooth. Her collaboration with Lanthimos continued in his next film  Alps that was awarded with the Best Screenplay Award at the Venice International Film Festival. In 2014, Angeliki Papoulia had the leading part of 'Maria' in Syllas Tzoumerkas' A Blast which premiered at the Locarno International Film Festival. In 2015, she appeared as the 'Heartless Woman' in Yorgos Lanthimos' Cannes awarded and Oscar nominated The Lobster. In 2019, her second collaboration with Tzoumerkas, thriller The Miracle of the Sargasso Sea'' premiered at the 69th Berlin International Film Festival.  For her performances in these five films, Angeliki Papoulia was widely praised by the international press, with Der Spiegel calling her "one of the most fearless European actresses working today'.

In 2016, Papoulia was a member of the Locarno International Film Festival Pardi di domani Jury and of the Sarajevo International Film Festival Competition Jury.

Filmography

Theatre work

References

External links

1975 births
21st-century Greek actresses
Actresses from Athens
Greek film actresses
Greek stage actresses
Greek television actresses
Living people